Precision Graphics Markup Language (PGML) is an XML-based language for representing vector graphics. It was a World Wide Web Consortium (W3C) submission by Adobe Systems, IBM, Netscape, and Sun Microsystems, that was not adopted as a recommendation. PGML is a 2D graphical format, offering precision for graphic artists, guaranteeing that the design created will appear in end user systems with the correct formatting, layout and the precision of color.

PGML and Vector Markup Language, another XML-based vector graphics language W3C submission supported by Autodesk, Hewlett-Packard, Macromedia, Microsoft, and Visio Corporation, were later joined and improved upon to create Scalable Vector Graphics (SVG).

Applications 
The ArgoUML CASE tool is able to export UML diagrams in PGML.

See also 
List of vector graphics markup languages

References

External links 
W3C 1998 Note

Graphics file formats
Markup languages
Vector graphics markup languages
XML-based standards